FTF may refer to:

Sport 
 Chadian Football Federation
 Federação Tocantinense de Futebol, the Football Federation of Tocantins, Brazil
 Tahitian Football Federation
 Togolese Football Federation
 Tunisian Football Federation

Other uses 
 FTF – Confederation of Professionals in Denmark
 Face to Face (disambiguation)
 Failure to feed
 Fair Trade Federation, an American trade association
 Fashion To Figure, an American clothing retailer
 Feed the Future Initiative, a program of the United States federal government
 First to file
 First things First
 First to find, an acronym used in geocaching
 Foreign Terrorist Fighters
 Fuck the Facts, a Canadian band
 Swedish Union of Insurance Employees
 The X-Files: Fight the Future, an American film